Oleg Ivanovich Lobov (7 September 1937 – 6 September 2018) was a Russian politician who served as acting First Deputy Chairman of the Council of Ministers of the Russian Soviet Federated Socialist Republic from 19 April 1991 to 15 November 1991 and also was acting Chairman of the Council of Ministers of the Russian SFSR from 26 September 1991 to 15 November 1991, shortly before the dissolution of the Soviet Union.

Until 17 March 1997, Lobov served in various capacities in Russian state and government bodies. His last position was Deputy Head of the Government of the Russian Federation. As of October 2010, Lobov is the chairman of the non-governmental Association for International Cooperation and participates in various construction-related associations and unions.

Education
Born in Kiev, he has a Candidate of Technical Sciences (PhD) degree and graduated from Rostov Institute of Engineers of Railway Transport in 1960.

Career

From 1960 to 1967, he was employed in chemistry and construction industries in Sverdlovsk. He occupied various posts in the Sverdlovsk Communist Party of the Soviet Union), where Boris Yeltsin made a party career, rising up to the regional party head. Then worked in construction and returned to party work in 1982.

From 19 April 19 to 15 November 1991 Lobov was First Deputy Chairman of the Council of Ministers of the RSFSR in the first and second cabinets of Ivan Silayev. With Silayev's resignation on 26 September 1991 Lobov became de facto acting prime minister of Russia. He kept the position until the formation of the reformist cabinet on 6 November and final resignation of Silayev's second cabinet on 15 November.

Controversy 

From 1991 to 1995, Lobov actively helped Aum Shinrikyo, a Japanese new religious movement, to establish operations in Russia. According to allegations made in the United States Senate in 1995, Lobov's relationship with Aum began in December 1991 and continued to 1995. Lobov was accused of receiving cash advances from Aum and of regularly meeting with Aum "minister of construction" Kiyohide Hayakawa. Lobov allegedly met with Shoko Asahara in Japan and arranged Asahara's own visit to Russia in 1992.

Business activity 

He established two business entities, Rinco (РИНКО) and ZentrEKOMASH (ЦЕНТР ЭНЕРГОМАШ).

Awards 
 Order of Lenin (1978)
 Order of the Badge of Honour (1974)
 Honorary title "Honoured Builder of the Russian Federation" (1982)
 Medal "For the Development of Virgin Lands" (1957)
 Medal "On the 40th anniversary of the completion of the national liberation struggle of the Czechoslovak people and the liberation of Czechoslovakia by the Soviet Army" (1985)
 Medal "Defender of Free Russia" (5 August 1994) for the execution of a citizen's duty during the defence of democracy and the constitutional regime, 19–21 August 1991, large contribution to the realization of democratic transformation, fortifying friendship and collaboration between nations
 State Prize of the Russian Federation in the field of science and technology (2000)

Footnotes

References
 Global Proliferation of Weapons of Mass Destruction: A Case Study on the Aum Shinrikyo. Part VI. Senate Government Affairs Permanent Subcommittee on Investigations. 31 October 1995 Staff Statement; retrieved 31 October 2010.
 Robin M. Frost (2005). Nuclear terrorism after 9/11, Issue 360. Routledge; .

Acting prime ministers of the Russian Federation
1937 births
2018 deaths
Deputy heads of government of the Russian Federation
Politicians from Kyiv
Soviet politicians
Economy ministers of Russia
Recipients of the Order of Lenin
State Prize of the Russian Federation laureates